Ross Drummond (born 20 March 1994) is a Scottish footballer who plays for Scottish Junior side Dundonald Bluebell.

Career
Drummond began his career with Burntisland Shipyard Amateur before joining the Dunfermline Athletic youth team at under-10 level. He joined the Dunfermline first-team in November 2011, making his senior debut in October 2012. He moved on loan to Berwick Rangers in February 2014. He re-joined Berwick for a second loan spell in October 2014. Drummond's move to Berwick was made permanent in January 2015.

Drummond left Berwick at the end of the 2015–16 season, signing for Scottish Junior side Dundonald Bluebell shortly after.

Career statistics

References

External links
 

1994 births
Living people
Scottish footballers
Burntisland Shipyard F.C. players
Dunfermline Athletic F.C. players
Berwick Rangers F.C. players
Dundonald Bluebell F.C. players
Scottish Football League players
Scottish Professional Football League players
Association football fullbacks